Harrestedgård, also known as Harrested Manor (Danish: Harrested Hovedgård), is a manor house and estate located 1+ kilometres northwest of Næstved, Denmark. The main building, which partly dates from the Middle Ages and partly from the 1840s, was listed on the Danish registry of protected buildings and places in 1918.

History

Rani and Markmand   families
A village named Harrested was in the Middle Ages located at the site. Harrestedgård was in the beginning of the 14th century owned by Karl Nielsen Rani.

After his death in 1344, Harrestedgård passed to his two children. his daughter, Ingerd Karlsdatter Rani, the widow of Peder Grubbe, brought her half of the estate into her second marriage with Iven Markmand. Iven Markmand became the sole owner of the estate when his brother-in-law died in 1366. Harrestedgård then remained in the hands of the Markmand family for the next 150 years.

Parsberg  family
Jørgen Evertsen Markmand, the last member of the Danish branch of the family, in 1500, sold Harrestedgård to the brothers Jørgen and Tønne Parsberg.

Both Jørgen Markmand and the Parsberg brothers were involved in a feud with Jørgen Rud, who claimed to be entitled to a share in the Harrestedgaard estate. In 1493, King John ruled in favour of Tud but his claim never seems to have been satisfied since he ten years later filed a complain over the treatment of him.

Tønne Parsberg passed Harrestedgård to his son, Verner Tønnesen Parsberg, a pricy counsellor, who played a significant role during the Northern Seven Years' War. Harrestedgaard remained in the hands of the Parsberg family for more than 130 years.

Lykke and Vind
 
In 1634, Frederik Parsberg sold the estate to Niels Lykke. He significantly increased the size of the estate. In 1638, it was acquired by Admiral Jørgen Vind. He was in 1755 killed in the Battle of Colberger Heide. Harrestedgård then passed to his three sons. In 1674, Holger Vind bought out his two brothers. In 1676, he was granted royal permission to close down the village of Harrested and placed both the windmill and all the land directly under the manor. In 1679, Holger Vind was appointed as Vice-Chancellor of Danish Chancellery.

Plessen family
 
Holger Vind's son, Vilhelm Carl Vind, sold Harrestedgård to Carl Adolf von Plessen. Plessen was already the owner of seven estates on the southern part of Zealand. Having no children, Plessen established De Plessenske Fideikommisgodser. Many of the later owners spent most of their time on their German estates.

Later owners
In 1925. Harrestedgård passed to Baron Johann Ludvig von Plessen. He served as German envoy in Rome. After the Second World War, an act was passed that made it possible to confiscate German property in Denmark. The government confiscated Harrestedgård and part of the land was subsequently sold off in lots.

In 1049, Ove Christian Riisberg  purchased the rest of the estate.e Lars Foghsgaard, who had made a fortune on the sale of Scandinavian Mobility, bought Harrestedgård in 1998. In 2002, he sold the estate to Jannik Hartvig Jensen.

Architecture
The oldest parts of the main building date from approximately 1350. The building is constructed in red brick on a foundation of field stone. The building is only 14 metre long. Many of the walls are 1.2 -1.3 m thick and have probably originally supported a two-storey building. This building was reduced to a single storey in the 1840s. 1.6 metres of the old walls were in the same time removed but the building was at the same time extended by more than nine metres to the south. Two east-facing, half-timbered side wings were formerly attached to the main wing. They were probably constructed during the Renaissance and demolished before 1816. An extension to the west side of the building was constructed in 1912. In 1923, a veranda was constructed towards the garden.

The building is now white-washed and has a red tile roof. The building was in 1953 refurbished under supervision of the architect s F. and L. Halleløv.
Fredningsstatus 2013: Hovedbygningen er fredet. The building was listed on the Danish registry of protected buildings and places in 1918.

Today
Harrestedgård was in 2012 acquired by  Vincens Chr. C. Lerche after he had ceded Benzonsdal to his son.

List of owners
 ( -1344) Karl Nielsen Rani 
 (1344-1350) Ingerd Karlsdatter Rani, gift 1) Grubbe 2) Markmand 
 (1350-1355) Asser Grubbe 
 ( -1355) Jakob Karlsen Rani 
 (1355-1386) Iven Markmand 
 (1386- ) Henrik Ivensen Markmand 
 ( -1423) Iven Henriksen Markmand 
 (1420- ) Henrik Ivensen Markmand 
 (1420-1446) Evert Ivensen Markmand 
 ( -1462) Karl Ivensen Markmand 
 (1462-1485) Evert Markmand 
 (1485-1503) Jørgen Evertsen Markmand 
 ( -1503) Jørgen Rud 
 (1503-1507) Jørgen Parsberg 
 (1503-1521) Tønne Parsberg 
 (1521-1567) Verner Tønnesen Parsberg 
 (1567-1575) Tønne Vernersen Parsberg 
 (1575-1592) Niels Vernersen Parsberg 
 (1592-1634) Frederik Nielsen Parsberg 
 (1634-1638) Niels Lykke 
 (1638-1644) Jørgen Vind 
 (1644-1674) Hans Jørgensen Vind 
 (1644-1674) Christian Jørgensen Vind 
 (1644-1683) Holger Jørgensen Vind 
 (1683-1702) Frederik Vind 
 (1702-1723) Vilhelm Carl Vind 
 (1723-1758) Carl Adolf von Plessen 
 (1758-1771) Estate of Carl Adolf von Plessen 
 (1771-1801) Christian Ludvig Scheel von Plessen 
 (1801-1819) Mogens Scheel von Plessen 
 (1819-1853) Mogens Joachim Scheel Plessen 
 (1853-1892) Carl Theodor August Scheel-Plessen 
 (1892-1924) Gustav Frederik Hugo von Plessen 
 (1924-1925) Estate of Gustav Frederik Hugo von Plessen 
 (1925-1946) Johann Ludvig von Plessen 
 (1946-1948) The Danish state
 (1948-1980) Ove Christian Riisberg 
 (1980-2002) Lars Foghsgaard 
 (2002-2012) Jannik Hartvig Jensen 
 (2012–present) Vincens Chr. C. Lerche

References 

Manor houses in Næstved Municipality
Listed buildings and structures in Næstved Municipality
Listed castles and manor houses in Denmark
Buildings and structures associated with the Parsberg family
Buildings and structures associated with the Plessen family
Buildings and structures associated with the Lerche family